Counterflow may refer to:
Counterflow lane a lane in which traffic flows in the opposite direction
Counterflow Centrifugation Elutriation (CCE) a cell separating technique
Counterflow in Cooling tower 
and Cooling tower's contact fill, of towers that wind streams vertically upward
Counterflow steam engine, such as Uniflow steam engine
Counterflow heat exchanger in Cryocooler or Recuperator
Counterflow in quantum turbulence
Counterflow Recordings, founded by Induce (musician)
Counterflow (EP), by Victoria Modesta (2016)